USS Lake Erie may refer to the following ships operated by the United States Navy:

 , a former cargo ship for the Navy from 1917 until she was sunk during an accident in 1919.
 , a currently-serving .

See also
 for other ships named after Lake Erie

United States Navy ship names